The Geoff Christian Medal, commonly referred to as the Christian Medal, is an Australian rules football award given to the best player in the Australian Football League (AFL) from one of the two teams based in Western Australia, the Fremantle Football Club and the West Coast Eagles. First awarded during the 1999 season, the award is named after and struck in honour of Geoff Christian (1934–1998), a sports writer and broadcaster who served as chief football writer for The West Australian between 1961 and 1988, before being posthumously inducted into the Australian Football Hall of Fame and the West Australian Football Hall of Fame in 2000 and 2004, respectively.

Votes for the medal are awarded by ABC Radio commentators on a 3–2–1 basis at the end of each match. The most recent medal, awarded at the end of the 2019 regular season, was won by Fremantle's Nat Fyfe. The award has been won multiple times by six players, Matthew Pavlich, Paul Hasleby, Nat Fyfe and Neale of Fremantle, and Daniel Kerr and Matt Priddis of West Coast. Fyfe has won the medal five times, the only player to do so.

List of winners
Votes tallies prior to 2002 are unknown.

References

Australian rules football awards
Australian Football League awards
Australian rules football in Western Australia
Awards established in 1999
1999 establishments in Australia
Australian rules football-related lists